The 2009 Mid-Eastern Athletic Conference men's basketball tournament, the culmination of the 2008–09 Mid-Eastern Athletic Conference men's basketball season and a part of the 2008-09 NCAA Division I men's basketball season, took place from March 10–March 14, 2009, at the Lawrence Joel Veterans Memorial Coliseum in Winston-Salem, North Carolina. The tournament was broadcast on the ESPNU.

The championship game matched Morgan State against Norfolk State, who made its first appearance in the MEAC championship game since it joined the league in 1997. Morgan State won 83–69, for its 2nd tournament title, the first won in 1977. As champion, Morgan State received the MEAC's automatic bid to the 2009 NCAA tournament.

Bracket

References

MEAC men's basketball tournament
2008–09 Mid-Eastern Athletic Conference men's basketball season
MEAC Men's Basketball